The 1st Medium Regiment, Royal Canadian Artillery was one of six Canadian medium artillery regiments that served in the European Theatre of World War II.  Medium regiments were armed with 5.5-inch and 4.5-inch guns.

History
The adjutant of the 1st Medium Regiment, RCA, was Captain Horace Trites; Trites was mentioned in dispatches in Italy. Trites and gun position officer (GPO) Lieutenant 'Buck' Buchanan later became pilots at 43 Operational Training Unit, RAF Andover, and fought in northwest Europe with No. 665 Squadron RCAF.

References

Sources
 Fromow, Lt-Col. D.L. Canada's Flying Gunners. (Ottawa: Air Observation Post Pilot's Association, 2002). .

Artillery regiments of Canada
Medium artillery regiments
Military units and formations disestablished in the 1940s